Boyss Toh Boyss Hain is 2013 Hindi comedy film directed by Amit Vats and produced by Chaitannya Swami and Anup Jalota. The film features Rajkummar Rao, Anshuman Jha, Dhruv Ganesh and Samrat  Arya  as main characters.

Cast

Rajkummar Rao as Abhishek 
Anshuman Jha as Karan
Dhruv Ganesh as Alphanso 
Samrat Arya as Bihari
Gulshan Grover as Inspector R. U. Sharma 
Divya Dutta
Manu Rishi
Adil Hussain
Tejaswini Kolhapure
Sharat Saxena
Virendra Saxena
Bhanu Sri Mehra as Twinkle

Plot

The movie "Boys Toh Boys Hain" is based on the lines of the celebrated comic book but set in Delhi instead of Riverdale. It's a movie with youthful story of four young guys who face the similar problem in their life. They are looking to fall in love but the right woman does not seem to be coming their way. The crux of the story is how they eventually find their way to their true love. All this is happening in comic way so we can say that there is laughter in the movie.

References

External links
 Boyss Toh Boyss Hain 2013 at Movies.Sulekha.com
 Boyss Toh Boyss Hain 2013 Movie Lyrics Full All Songs Lyrics, Movie Information & Reviews
 
 

2010s Hindi-language films
Indian romantic comedy films
2013 films
2013 romantic comedy films